The environmental effects of transport in Australia are considerable. Australia subsidizes fossil fuel energy, keeping prices artificially low and raising greenhouse gas emissions due to the increased use of fossil fuels as a result of the subsidies.  The Australian Energy Regulator and state agencies such as the New South Wales' Independent Pricing and Regulatory Tribunal set and regulate electricity prices, thereby lowering production and consumer cost.

According to a report by The Institute for Sustainable Futures (ISF)  at University of Technology Sydney, titled: "Energy and Transport Subsidies in Australia", roughly 70% of the country's greenhouse gas emissions are caused by the energy and transport industries. The uptake of renewable energy in these sectors is slow because of subsidies to fossil fuels and the high cost of acquiring the sophisticated technology required to produce cleaner fuels.  Furthermore, fossil fuels are easier to transport and use, compared to renewable energy, which often requires sophisticated instruments to acquire and store. The report revealed that for the 2005–2006 financial year, transport subsidies were measured to reach up to $10.1 billion, of which 74% related to transport, 18% to electricity, and 4% to renewable and efficient energy. These subsidies help energy generation companies increase their profits, therefore encouraging the building of additional coal-fuel power plants. Investing in other, more sustainable, types of electricity generation plants would have cost less than continuing to subsidize the building of these power plants. On a positive note, alternative transport fuels such as natural gas and liquefied petroleum gas are excused from fuel excise/tax.

Tax calculated for the use of a company car is calculated as such: the further the person drives the car, the higher the business use and the lower the personal use. Since tax is calculated based on personal use, drivers tend to drive longer distances to lessen the amount of tax that they have to pay. This leads to higher consumption of vehicular fossil fuels and, subsequently, higher greenhouse gas emissions.

Dr. Hal Turton, the Group Leader of the Energy Economics Group at Swiss research establishment, the Paul Scherrer Institute, discussed in his report for Canberra-based think tank The Australia Institute titled: "The Aluminium Smelting Industry: Structure, Market Power, Subsidies and Greenhouse Gas Emissions", that the yearly electrical use subsidy for the use of the six aluminum smelters in Australia is at least A$210 million. According to the report, Australia's aluminium smelting industry is a party to one of the most subsidized electricity charges as compared to other similar establishments. The ISF report found that removing electrical subsidies would bring up electricity prices by 3.9%, which would lead to a fall in demand for electricity by 1.4% in the long run. Reducing transport subsidies would increase prices by 32%, which would lead to a fall in demand worth 18%. It suggests that subsidies should be removed gradually so as not to hurt drivers who have no choice but to use petrol (due to the lack of alternatives), and that taxpayer's funds be channeled to subsidize the sustainable energy industry instead.

The National Roads and Motorists' Association (NRMA) is pushing for Australian petrol consumption to be reduced by 50% by 2050. It is advocating a move towards greener transport and has called for a reduction of the A$10 billion subsidies given to the nation's fossil fuel industry.

Details of subsidies
Coal power industries are subsidized under the Greenhouse Gas Abatement Program (GGAP).

Jamison Report
The Jamison Report was published by the NRMA in July 2008, and focused on alternative fuels and reducing emissions from motor vehicles. It was written by the Jamison Group, a team of four well-respected academics in the transport and energy fields, namely: CSIRO energy advisor David Lamb, University of New South Wales environmental science professor Mark Diesendorf, Macquarie University management professor John Mathews and Monash University Honorary Senior Research Fellow, Graeme Pearman.

The report was titled: "A Roadmap for Alternative Fuels in Australia: Ending our Dependence on Oil".

The report suggests a 12-step 'roadmap' to address the issue of fossil fuel usage in motor vehicles.
Reduce oil dependence in Australia by 20 percent by 2020; 30 percent by 2030; and by 50 percent by 2050. This would complement the National Emissions Trading Scheme.
Promote and develop alternative fuels
Compulsory fuel consumption and carbon dioxide standards
Further compulsory emissions standards. This point suggests that the authorities bring emissions standards for greenhouse gases such as carbon monoxide on par with world standards to align the country's policies to international best practices.
Alternative fuel market mandates. The Group recommends that voluntary targets be scrapped in favour of "mandated targets of five percent in 2010; 15 percent in 2015; and 20 percent in 2020". According to the report, the targets are required to fuel the growth of investment in sustainable fuel industries and wrest the grip of the energy market away from the small group of large oil and coal companies that dominate the industry. It goes on to say that: "Mandates beyond 20 percent will not be needed as market forces will take over beyond that point".
Tax incentives for vehicles running on alternative fuels or propulsion systems. The Group suggests that tax incentives be given to producers of greener cars, and to consumers who purchase such vehicles.
Tax incentives for alternative fuels and infrastructure. The group suggests that tax intensives should be given to any establishment that comes up with clean fuels or constructs the infrastructure required to develop the industry. Also, it suggests giving exemptions to fuel tax for those who use alternative fuel.
Wind back subsidies that reinforce oil dependence. This is in particular reference to the A$10 billion worth of subsidies handed out to producers and users of fossil-fuel transport fuel.
Use of Green Car Fund. This is about the federal government's pre-election promise to provide a Green Car Fund for the country's motor industry.
State governments to play their role. Here, the Group suggests that state governments adjust their taxes and tariffs. For example, consumers who drive vehicles that consume lesser amounts of fuel should be made to pay lower registration fees.
Allow carbon credits to grow alternative fuel industries. The idea is that to encourage growth in the alternative fuels industry, the government should allow carbon credits to be awarded to players in that industry.
Foster urban public transport and sustainable mobility options. Here, the group calls for improved public transport infrastructure and for better facilities for walking and cycling.

Types of financial subsidies
The International Energy Agency defines an energy subsidy as: "...any government action that concerns primarily the energy sector that lowers the cost of energy production, raises the price received by energy producers or lowers the price paid by energy consumers."

There are six types of financial subsidies practiced:
Direct financial transfer: This is usually the simplest type of subsidy to recognize since governments normally declare these in yearly budget reports. Such subsidies can come in the form of rebates, direct subsidies, grants, or low-interest loans.
Tax expenditure: These are incentives, rebates, exemptions, and benefits offered by the tax system.
Energy related services provided by the public service at lower than the actual cost: Items that fall under this category are Government spending in energy infrastructure and services, public grants for studies conducted on energy-related subjects, and subsidies are given to run facilities and services that fall below reaching the supposed return on investment.
Capital cost subsidies: These include subsidies on interest rates, debts, and liability guarantees.
Trade restrictions: These include restrictions such as embargoes, quotas, and increased production costs.
Energy sector regulation: These include price controls, market protection policies, and demand guarantees.

Public opinion
According to a survey conducted by Australian polling and market research company Newspoll in March 2008:
60% of all respondents from all states said that they would like to see a lot more resources pumped into subsidizing renewable energy, while another 30% said that they would prefer if both fossil fuel energy and renewable energy were given equal funding.
29% feel that the federal government provides more subsidies to fossil fuel energy compared to renewable energy. A further 26% are of the view that there is an equal level of funding, while 36% do not know.
56% of those who wanted to see equal or more funding for renewable energy want the federal government to kick in subsidies immediately, while a further 28% wanted action to be taken within the year.

See also
 Climate Change in Australia
 Carbon Pollution Reduction Scheme
 Carbon capture and storage in Australia
 Effects of global warming on Australia
 Energy policy of Australia
 Feed-in tariffs in Australia
 Garnaut Climate Change Review
 Greenhouse Mafia
 Greenhouse Solutions with Sustainable Energy
 Mandatory renewable energy targets
 Mitigation of global warming in Australia
 New South Wales Greenhouse Gas Abatement Scheme
 Renewable energy in Australia

References 

Climate change in Australia
Transport in Australia
Australia
Transport